The Elberfelder Hut is a mountain hut belonging to the German Alpine Club in the Schober Group within the Austrian Alps.

The mountain hut stands at 2,346 m in the upper Gößnitz valley and is managed from mid-June to mid-September. The Wuppertal branch of the German Alpine Club is responsible for it. The Siegburg and Recklinghausen branches also participate in managing the hut.

History 
The Elberfelder Hut was built in 1928. In the years 1982 and 1983, following an avalanche, the hut was renovated and extended. In 2005 repair work was carried out on the façade and roof. The hut has its own hydropower station to provide power and is exclusively supplied by helicopter.

The house is named after the Wuppertal quarter of Elberfeld.

Ascents 
 From Heiligenblut on the Elberfelder Weg through the Gößnitztal in 4 to 5 hours
 From Heiligenblut via the Langtalseen in 6 hours
 Via the Lienzer Hut and Gößnitz col (Gößnitzscharte): 4 hours
All timings refer to the actual journey time without stops and delays.

Tours

Summit tours 
 Roter Knopf,  to the second-highest peak in the Schober Group in 3½ hours.
 Böses Weibl,  along the Vienna Ridgeway (Wiener Höhenweg) in 3 hours.
 Kreuzkopf, 2½ hours.
 Glödis, 5½ hours.

Crossings 
The Elberfelder Hut is on the Vienna Ridgeway, which runs from the Iselsberg to the Glocknerhaus. Its neighbouring huts are reached as follows:

 To the Adolf-Noßberger Hut there is a crossing using the Vienna Ridgeway via the Horn Col (Hornscharte), which takes 5 hours of journey time.
 The shorter crossing to the Noßberger Hut via the Klammer Col (Klammerscharte) is only advisable in good snow conditions. From mid-July it is usually dangerous and not recommended due to the high risk of rockfalls and lack of snow.
 Also on the Vienna Ridgeway is the Glorer Hut in the Glockner Group which may be reached in 5–6 hours via the Kesselkees Saddle and the Peischlachtörl.
 Via the Gößnitz Col (Gößnitzscharte) ) south of the hut to the Lienzer Hut in 3–4 hours.
 Via the Leibniztörl in 7 hours to the Hochschober Hut.

Accident 
On 8 September 2016, shortly after take-off, a helicopter on the return leg of a supply flight to the Elberfelder Hut, crashed into the mountainside killing its pilot, Hannes Arch. The hut manager, who had spontaneously decided to accompany Arch, was injured but was able to be rescued.

References

Literature 
 Alpenvereinskarte 41 Schobergruppe. Deutscher Alpenverein, Munich, 2005.

External links 
 Elberfelder Hütte

Mountain huts in Austria
Schober Group